DeLisle is a census-designated place (CDP) in Harrison County, Mississippi, United States. It is part of the Gulfport–Biloxi Metropolitan Statistical Area. The population was 1,147 at the 2010 census.

Geography
It is located on the north side of DeLisle Bayou and the Wolf River, which separate the community from the city of Pass Christian.

Settlement
Pierre Le Moyne d'Iberville was chosen by Louis Phélypeaux, comte de Pontchartrain, Louis XIV's minister of Marine, to establish a French colony in the area.   On d'Iberville's second trip to the Gulf in 1699-1700, d'Iberville was accompanied by the accomplished royal cartographer, Compte Guillaume Delisle.  During this expedition, they charted and named Bayou Portage, Bayou Arcadia, and Bayou Delisle.
The unincorporated area north of the bayou, known as DeLisle, shares a zip code with Pass Christian, Mississippi, but is not within the city limits. The early settlement was called La Riviere des Loups (Wolf River). The earliest verifiable records for the DeLisle area show that Barthelome Grelot was followed by his brother-in-law Philipe Saucier, who received two Spanish land grants; one in the St. Louis Bay area, recorded on August 27, 1781, followed in 1794, with a second tract that was situated on Bayou DeLisle, adjacent to his brother-in-law, Bartholome Grelot. These early French settlers were soon joined by Jean Baptiste Nicaise, Pierre Moran, Ramon Lizana, Chevalier DeDeaux, Jean Cassibry, and Charles Ladner.

A post office operated under the name DeLisle from 1884 to 1974.

DuPont opened a titanium dioxide plant in DeLisle in 1979. This plant, now operated by Chemours, is the second-largest producer of titanium dioxide in the world.

Demographics

2020 census

As of the 2020 United States census, there were 1,275 people, 440 households, and 304 families residing in the CDP.

Notable people
 Beulah Mae Donald, Civil Rights activist
 Matteo Martinolich, shipbuilder
 Jesmyn Ward, author; recipient of the 2011 and the 2017 National Book Awards for Fiction.

References

Census-designated places in Harrison County, Mississippi
Census-designated places in Mississippi
Gulfport–Biloxi metropolitan area